The sixth season of the American fictional drama television series ER first aired on September 30, 1999, and concluded on May 18, 2000.  The sixth season consists of 22 episodes.

Plot
In the first major cast change in ER, the sixth season sees the addition of four new characters:  Dr. Luka Kovač; nurse, later third-year medical student, Abby Lockhart; Dr. Cleo Finch; and Dr. Dave Malucci. Paul McCrane's Robert Romano is now billed as a series regular and we also see the return of Deb Chen from season one, now preferring to be called Dr. Jing-Mei Chen. Physician Assistant Jeanie Boulet leaves to care for her HIV-positive child. Lucy Knight and John Carter are attacked and stabbed by a psychotic patient. The ER staff work to save Carter and Lucy. Despite everyone's best efforts, they are unable to save Lucy who succumbs to her wounds and dies.  

In addition Croatian doctor Luka Kovač joins the team and struggles to gain the respect and trust from his new colleagues in the ER. Hathaway struggles to begin parenting on her own, then decides to leave Chicago to begin a new life with Doug Ross. Greene and Corday begin their relationship and he deals with the death of his father. Abby Lockhart begins her third-year-med-student rotation. While still recovering from the violent attack that left him near death and killed Lucy, Carter develops an addiction to pain medication, forcing Greene, Chen, and Weaver along with Benton and the other doctors into an intervention to get Carter to realize that he's an addict. Carter then accepts that he's an addict and checks into a rehab in the season finale with Benton accompanying him. This season saw the exits of Julianna Margulies, Gloria Reuben and Kellie Martin as series regulars.

Cast

Main cast
 Anthony Edwards as Dr. Mark Greene – Attending Physician
 Noah Wyle as Dr. John Carter – Resident PGY-4
 Julianna Margulies as Carol Hathaway – Nurse Manager (episodes 1–21)
 Gloria Reuben as Jeanie Boulet – Physician Assistant (episodes 1–6)
 Laura Innes as Dr. Kerry Weaver – Chief of Emergency Medicine
 Alex Kingston as Dr. Elizabeth Corday – Associate Chief of Surgery
 Kellie Martin as Lucy Knight – Fourth-year Medical Student (episodes 1–14)
 Paul McCrane as  Dr. Robert Romano – Chief of Staff and Surgery
 Goran Visnjic as Dr. Luka Kovač – Attending Physician
 Maura Tierney as Abby Lockhart – Third-year Medical Student (episodes 12–22)
 Michael Michele as Dr. Cleo Finch – Pediatric Fellow
 Erik Palladino as Dr. Dave Malucci – Resident PGY-2 (episodes 2–22)
 Ming-Na as Dr. Jing-Mei Chen – Resident PGY-3 (episodes 10–22)
 Eriq La Salle as Dr. Peter Benton – Surgical Trauma Fellow

Supporting cast

Doctors and Medical Students
 Alan Alda as Dr. Gabriel Lawrence – Attending Physician
 Sam Anderson as Dr. Jack Kayson – Chief of Cardiology
 Amy Aquino as Dr. Janet Coburn – Chief of Obstetrics and Gynecology
 John Aylward as Dr. Donald Anspaugh – Surgical Attending Physician, Hospital Board Member
 John Doman as Dr. Carl DeRaad – Chief of Psychiatry
 Michael Buchman Silver as Dr. Paul Meyers – Psychiatrist
 Scott Jaeck as Dr. Steven Flint – Chief of Radiology
 David Brisbin as Dr. Alexander Babcock – Anesthesiologist
 Tom Gallop as Dr. Roger Julian – Chief of Genetics
 Perry Anzilotti as Dr. Ed – Anesthesiologist 
 Megan Cole as Dr. Alice Upton – Pathologist
 Stephanie Dunnam as Dr. McLucas
 Randy Lowell as Dr. Dan Shine

Nurses
 Ellen Crawford as Nurse Lydia Wright
Conni Marie Brazelton as Nurse Conni Oligario
 Deezer D as Nurse Malik McGrath
 Laura Cerón as Nurse Chuny Marquez
 Yvette Freeman as Nurse Haleh Adams
 Lily Mariye as Nurse Lily Jarvik
 Gedde Watanabe as Nurse Yosh Takata
 Dinah Lenney as Nurse Shirley
 Bellina Logan as Nurse Kit
 Kyle Richards as Nurse Dori Kerns
 Suzanne Carney as OR Nurse Janet
 Lucy Rodriguez as Nurse Bjerke
 Morris Chestnut as ICU Nurse Frank "Rambo" Bacon
 Jeannie Lee as Nurse Vivian
 Elizabeth Rodriguez as Nurse Sandra
 Mary Heiss as Nurse Mary

Staff, Paramedics and Officers
 Erica Gimpel as Social Worker Adele Newman
 Kristin Minter as Desk Clerk Miranda "Randi" Fronczak
 Troy Evans as Desk Clerk Frank Martin
 Andrew Bowen as Desk Clerk Andrew
 Pamela Sinha as Desk Clerk Amira
 Jeff Cahill as Transport Dispatcher Tony Fig
 Emily Wagner as Paramedic Doris Pickman
 Montae Russell as Paramedic Dwight Zadro
 Lyn Alicia Henderson as Paramedic Pamela Olbes
 Demetrius Navarro as Paramedic Morales
 Brian Lester as Paramedic Brian Dumar
 Michelle Bonilla as Paramedic Christine Harms
 Meg Thalken as Chopper EMT Dee McManus
 Mike Genovese as Officer Al Grabarsky
 Cress Williams as Officer Reggie Moore
 Chad McKnight as Officer Wilson
 David Roberson as Officer Durcy
 Joe Basile as Officer Tom Bennini

Family
 Khandi Alexander as Jackie Robbins
 Lisa Nicole Carson as Carla Simmons
 Matthew Watkins as Reese Benton
 John Cullum as David Greene
 Yvonne Zima as Rachel Greene
 Judy Parfitt as Isabelle Corday
 Frances Sternhagen as Millicent Carter

Guest stars
 Rebecca De Mornay as Elaine Nichols
 Emile Hirsch as Chad Kottmeier
 David Krumholtz as Paul Sobriki
 Liza Weil as Samantha Sobriki
 Shia LaBeouf as Darnel Smith
 Anton Yelchin as Robbie Edelstein
 George Clooney  as Dr. Doug Ross (uncredited)
 Randolph Mantooth as Policeman at school
 Vincent Kartheiser as Jesse Keenan
 Martha Plimpton as Meg Corwin
 Mitch Pileggi as Terry Waters
 Gabrielle Union as Tamara Davis
 Dakota Fanning as Delia Chadsey

Production
Original executive producers John Wells and Michael Crichton reprised their roles. Lydia Woodward also returned as an executive producer but left the crew with the close of the season. Long-time crew member and fifth season executive producer Christopher Chulack moved on to executive produce Wells' new series Third Watch but remained a consulting producer for ER. Fifth season supervising producers Jack Orman and Neal Baer were promoted to co-executive producers for the sixth season. R. Scott Gemmill joined the crew as a supervising producer and writer. Fifth season producers Penny Adams and Wendy Spence Rosato returned for the sixth season. Fifth season co-producers Richard Thorpe and Jonathan Kaplan were promoted to producers for the sixth season. They were joined by new producers Doug Palau and Patrick Harbinson. Palau left the crew mid-season and Adams and Harbinson left at the end of the season. Michael Salmunovich returned as a co-producer and Teresa Salamunovich joined the crew, initially as a production co-ordinator but was promoted to associate producer mid-season. She was joined by new associate producer Vicki Voltarel who was on staff for the second half of the season only.

Wells and Woodward continued to write episodes and Wells contributed two episodes while Woodward wrote three. Orman wrote four episodes and Baer, Harbinson, and Gemmill each wrote three. Series medical expert and fifth season story editor Joe Sachs was promoted to executive story editor for the sixth season and he wrote a further two episodes. Regular writer Linda Gase replaced him as story editor and contributed a further episode. New writer Sandy Kroopf wrote a single episode.

Producers Kaplan and Thorpe served as the seasons regular directors; Kaplan directed five episodes and Thorpe helmed three.  Cast members Laura Innes and Anthony Edwards each directed a further episode. Returning directors were Lesli Linka Glatter, Félix Enríquez Alcalá, Christopher Misiano, David Nutter, and Steve De Jarnatt. New directors include Ken Kwapis, Marita Grabiak, medical consultant Fred Einesman, Kevin Hooks, and Peter Markle.

Episodes

References

External links 

1999 American television seasons
2000 American television seasons
ER (TV series) seasons